The Academia Nacional de Letras (English: "National Academy of Letters") is an association of academics and experts on the use of the Spanish language in Uruguay.

It was founded in Montevideo on February 10, 1943. Among the first members were Cardinal Antonio María Barbieri, Emilio Frugoni, Juana de Ibarbourou, Emilio Oribe, Alberto Zum Felde.

Since 1960, it is a member of the Association of Spanish Language Academies.

See also
 Diccionario del español del Uruguay
 :Category:Members of the Uruguayan Academy of Language

External links
 Academia Nacional de Letras del Uruguay (Spanish)

Spanish language academies
Uruguayan culture
Organizations established in 1943
1943 establishments in Uruguay